Formed in 1947, the 57th Signal Company is an independent communications company of the U.S. Army.  The 57th Signal Company has deployed to Iraq, Alaska, Alaska, Korea, Vietnam, and Korea. Germany serves as the company's current headquarters.

The unit's current nickname is “Titans”

History
Constituted 4 December 1943, in the US Army as the 311th Signal Service Battalion, it was activated 27 December 1943 at Fort Monmouth, New Jersey. It was redesignated the 77th Signal Service Battalion 18 June 1947. 20 October 1947, it was reorganized and redesignated as the 57th Signal Service Company. It was inactivated in Germany, 5 March 1949. It was redesignated on 5 February 1953 as the 57th Signal Support Company. 12 March 1953, it was reactivated in Korea. 15 April 1954 it was reorganized and redesignated as the 57th Signal Company.

The 57th Signal Company was reactivated in Schweinfurt on 16 February 2006 by redesignation of Company A, 121st Signal Battalion. The 57th Signal Company deployed with the 2nd Brigade Combat Team, 1st Infantry Division, in Operation Iraqi Freedom 5-6. The 57th Signal company employed the Joint Network Node equipment suite and is a model for the new signal support concept for "brigade units of action" (BUA). The 57th Signal Company currently supports the 172nd Infantry Brigade Combat Team (Separate).

List of activation and inactivation dates and places:
 13 May 1955 inactivated Korea
 8 August 1957 reactivated Korea
 15 November 1967 inactivated Korea
 24 February 1969 reactivated Vietnam
 1 April 1970 deactivated after Vietnam
 16 February 1973 reactivated Ft. Richardson, Alaska
 15 August 1986 inactivated Ft Richardson, Alaska
 16 August 1992 reactivated Germany
 15 September 1994 deactivated Germany
 16 February 2006 reactivated Germany

Campaigns
Vietnam
Tet 69. Counteroffensive,
Summer-Fall 1969,
Winter-Spring 1970

Korea
3rd Korean Winter,
Summer 1953

WWII
Northern and Central Europe

Iraq
Operation Iraqi Freedom,
Fall 2006
Iraq
Operation Iraqi Freedom,
Winter 2008

Decorations
 Army Meritorious Unit Commendation
 Embroidered Streamer: European Theater

Coat of arms

Sources
 https://web.archive.org/web/20080618150432/http://www.57sig.2bct.1id.army.mil/
 https://web.archive.org/web/20080618085140/http://www.2bct.1id.army.mil/Primary%20Sites/index.htm

Notes

Signal 057
Signal units and formations of the United States Army